Josephine Marchment Brown (born 6 May 1897 in Rathmore, Co. Kerry, died 1966), known as Mary, was an important spy for Michael Collins during the Irish war of independence.

Early life

She was youngest of ten children of Henry James McCoy, an RIC officer from Pallaskenry, Co. Limerick, and Bridget McCoy (née O'Sullivan), from Bonane, Kenmare, Co. Kerry.  She remained Marchment Brown until she married Florence O'Donoghue in 1921.In 1910, she moved to Wales. She married her first husband, Coleridge Marchment (alias Brown) in 1913. She gave birth to their son Reggie, with a second son, Gerald, arriving in 1915. Her husband was killed in the first world war, and when she lost custody of her eldest son to her parents-in-law, members of the Cork IRA brought him back to Cork from Wales. O'Donoghue was influential in organising this operation, and during 1919–21

Life as a spy

Josephine worked as a typist in the Victoria (latterly Collins) Barracks in Cork and became one of Collins' most important intelligence agents. Josephine Marchment Brown took the codename 'G', after her younger son.  Josephine and her husband lived at Loughlene, Eglantine Park, Douglas Road, Cork, with their two sons and two daughters, and her two sons from her first marriage. Her husband died on 16 December 1967 in Mercy Hospital, Cork, leaving an estate of £14,487. His papers are in the NLI and his statement to the Bureau of Military History is in the Military Archives.

Sources
 NLI, Florence O'Donoghue papers; BMH, WS 554; Cork Examiner, 18 Dec. 1967
 Michael Hopkinson, Green against green (1988)
 Dan Harvey and Gerry White, The barracks (1997)
 Peter Hart, The IRA and its enemies (1998)
 Eunan O'Halpin, Defending Ireland (1999)
 John Borgonovo (ed.), Florence and Josephine O‘Donoghue's war of independence (2006)

References

Irish War of Independence
1897 births
1966 deaths
Women in war 1900–1945
Women in war in Ireland
Spies during the Irish War of Independence
Female wartime spies